James Bree is the name of:

James Bree (actor) (1923–2008), British actor
James Bree (footballer) (born 1997), English footballer